The enzyme citramalyl-CoA lyase catalyzes the chemical reaction

(3S)-citramalyl-CoA  acetyl-CoA + pyruvate

This enzyme belongs to the family of lyases, specifically the oxo-acid-lyases, which cleave carbon-carbon bonds.  The systematic name of this enzyme class is (3S)-citramalyl-CoA pyruvate-lyase (acetyl-CoA-forming). Other names in common use include citramalyl coenzyme A lyase, (+)-CMA-CoA lyase, and (3S)-citramalyl-CoA pyruvate-lyase.  This enzyme participates in pyruvate metabolism and c5-branched dibasic acid metabolism.

References

 
 

EC 4.1.3
Enzymes of unknown structure